Michael Norman Carter (born February 18, 1948) is a former wide receiver in the National Football League.

Biography
Carter was born Michael Norman Carter on February 18, 1948, in Little Rock, Arkansas.

Career
Carter was drafted by the Green Bay Packers in the fifteenth round of the 1970 NFL Draft and played that season and the 1971 season with the team. He was traded in 1973 and played with the San Diego Chargers during the 1973 NFL season. He went on to play with the 
"Philadelphia Bell", in the World Football League, before retiring in 1976.

He was a "NCAA - ALL American" in 1969; selected to the College "Hall of Fame" and Sacramento Metropolitan Chamber of Commerce "Hall Of Fame" while attending University at California State University, Sacramento.  California State University, Sacramento.

See also
List of Green Bay Packers players

References

Sportspeople from Little Rock, Arkansas
Green Bay Packers players
San Diego Chargers players
American football wide receivers
California State University, Sacramento alumni
Sacramento State Hornets football players
1948 births
Living people